The wedding of Prince Henry, Duke of Gloucester, and Lady Alice Montagu Douglas Scott took place on Wednesday, 6 November 1935, in the private chapel at Buckingham Palace. A larger public ceremony had been planned for Westminster Abbey, but plans were scaled back after the bride's father, the 7th Duke of Buccleuch, died of cancer on 19 October.

Engagement

The engagement between Prince Henry, Duke of Gloucester, third son of King George V and Queen Mary, and Lady Alice Montagu Douglas Scott, third daughter of the 7th Duke and Duchess of Buccleuch, was announced on 2 September 1935 at Balmoral Castle.

Alice later recalled there was no formal proposal and the Duke had "mumbled it as we were on a walk one day." 

The wedding date was set for 6 November 1935 and plans were in place for a lavish public celebration at Westminster Abbey like the weddings of the Duke's siblings. However, mere weeks before the wedding, the bride's father died of cancer on 19 October 1935. This, in combination with the consideration of the king's ill health, led to the wedding being moved to the more modest venue of the private chapel at Buckingham Palace.

Wedding
The wedding took place on 6 November 1935 in the private chapel at Buckingham Palace. 

That morning, the Duke had breakfast with his parents, the King and Queen, at Buckingham Palace. Lady Alice left her family's home in Grosvenor Place in the Glass Coach with her brother, the 8th Duke of Buccleuch. They made the short journey to Buckingham Palace by way of Constitution Hill through Wellington Arch. At the palace, they joined the bridesmaids and proceeded into the chapel.

Cosmo Gordon Lang, Archbishop of Canterbury, presided over the traditional Anglican ceremony, assisted by Arthur Winnington-Ingram, Bishop of London, and Arthur Maclean, Primus of the Scottish Episcopal Church.

Music
The hymn "Praise, my soul, the King of heaven" was sung and the recessional music was Wedding March from A Midsummer Night's Dream by Felix Mendelssohn.

Attendants
The Duke was supported by his two elder brothers, the Prince of Wales and the Duke of York. Lady Alice was attended by eight bridesmaids; Princess Elizabeth of York and Princess Margaret Rose of York, the daughters of the Duke and Duchess of York, thus nieces of the groom; Lady Mary Cambridge, daughter of the Marquess and Marchioness of Cambridge, thus the groom's maternal first cousin once removed; Lady Angela Montagu Douglas Scott, the bride's sister; Lady Elizabeth Montagu Douglas Scott, daughter of the Duke and Duchess of Buccleuch, thus the bride's niece; Anne Hawkins, the daughter of Lady Margaret and Commander Geoffrey Hawkins, thus the bride's niece; Clare Phipps, daughter of Lady Sybil and Charles Phipps, thus the bride's niece; and Moyra Montagu Douglas Scott, daughter of Lord George Montagu Douglas Scott, thus the bride's paternal first cousin.

Attire

Lady Alice wore a blush pink satin gown designed by Norman Hartnell. This choice of colour was unusual for a royal bride; however, due to her age, Lady Alice wished to have a "less maiden tone". The gown was the first of many important gowns designed by Hartnell for the British royal family. He would later go on to design Princess Elizabeth's wedding gown and later her coronation gown, as well as Princess Margaret's wedding gown.

The Duke wore the uniform of the 10th Royal Hussars with the riband and star of the Order of the Garter, star of the Order of the Thistle and the Royal Victorian Chain.

Gifts
The couple received a large number of gifts from individuals, organizations and members of their families. The gifts were publically displayed at St James's Palace. 

The groom gave his bride a diamond tiara and diamond knot brooch. The King and Queen presented their new daughter-in-law with a pearl, emerald and diamond suite containing gems that had originally belonged to Queen Alexandra, and a diamond and pearl suite featuring a large baroque pearl brooch. The Queen gave her a turquoise and diamond parure which she herself had received as a wedding gift from her own parents, the Duke and Duchess of Teck, in 1893, and a diamond tiara. The groom's nieces and nephews, Princess Elizabeth, Princess Margaret Rose, Viscount Lascelles and the Hon. Gerald Lascelles gave two grenade-shaped cigarette lighters. The groom's aunt and uncle, Queen Maud and King Haakon VII of Norway, and cousin and cousin-in-law, Crown Prince Olav and Crown Princess Märtha, sent a silver and enamel desk set.

Before his death, the bride's father presented her with a single string of pearls which was exhibited with the other presents. The Dowager Duchess of Buccleuch gave her daughter a portrait of herself and a diamond and turquoise needlework box.

Other gifts included: a pair of silver porringers and covers from City of York; a gold cigarette case from Lord Howard de Walden; a pair of silver quaiches from Admiral and Mrs Mark Kerr; and three Steuben glass fish from Mrs Roxana Wentworth van Rensselaer.

Guests
Owing to the scaled-back celebrations and the small size of the private chapel, the wedding was attended by just over 100 guests, mostly close family and friends.

Relatives of the groom
 The King and Queen, the groom's parents
 The Prince of Wales, the groom's brother
 The Duke and Duchess of York, the groom's brother and sister-in-law
 Princess Elizabeth of York, the groom's niece
 Princess Margaret Rose of York, the groom's niece
 The Princess Royal and The Earl of Harewood, the groom's sister and brother-in-law
 Viscount Lascelles, the groom's nephew
 The Hon. Gerald Lascelles, the groom's nephew
 The Duke and Duchess of Kent, the groom's brother and sister-in-law
 Louise, Princess Royal's family:
 Princess and Prince Arthur of Connaught, the groom's paternal first cousin and the groom's paternal first cousin once removed
 Lady Maud and Lord Carnegie, the groom's paternal first cousin and her husband
 The Queen of Norway, the groom's paternal aunt
 Princess Helena Victoria, the groom's paternal first cousin once removed
 Princess Marie Louise, the groom's paternal first cousin once removed
 The Princess Louise, Duchess of Argyll, the groom's paternal great aunt
 The Duke of Connaught and Strathearn, the groom's paternal great uncle
 Lady Patricia and The Hon. Sir Alexander Ramsay, the groom's paternal first cousin once removed and her husband
 Alexander Ramsay, the groom's paternal second cousin
 The Earl of Athlone and Princess Alice, Countess of Athlone, the groom's maternal uncle and aunt (also first cousin once removed)
 The Princess Beatrice, the groom's paternal great aunt
 The Marquess and Marchioness of Cambridge, the groom's maternal first cousin and his wife 
 Lady Mary Cambridge, the groom's maternal first cousin once removed
 King George II of the Hellenes, the groom's paternal second cousin
 The Crown Prince of Sweden, husband of the groom's paternal second cousin

Relatives of the bride
 The Dowager Duchess of Buccleuch and Queensberry, the bride's mother
 Lady Margaret and Commander Geoffrey Hawkins, the bride's sister and brother-in-law
 Miss Anne Hawkins, the bride's niece
 The Duke and Duchess of Buccleuch and Queensberry, the bride's brother and sister-in-law
 Lady Elizabeth Montagu Douglas Scott, the bride's niece
 Earl of Dalkeith, the bride's nephew
 Lady Caroline Montagu Douglas Scott, the bride's niece
 Lord William Montagu Douglas Scott, the bride's brother
 Lady Sybil and Mr Charles Phipps, the bride's sister and brother-in-law
 Miss Clare Phipps, the bride's niece
 Lady and Lord Burghley, the bride's sister and brother-in-law
 Lady Angela Montagu Douglas Scott, the bride's sister
 Lord George Montagu Douglas Scott, the bride's brother
 Lord George Montagu Douglas Scott, the bride's paternal uncle
 Miss Moyra Montagu Douglas Scott, the bride's paternal first cousin

Aftermath
After the ceremony, the newlyweds proceeded from the chapel to an adjoining drawing room to sign the register. Afterward, they appeared with their families on the palace balcony. The crowds were especially delighted by the appearance of Princess Elizabeth and Princess Margaret Rose. They returned inside for a short wedding breakfast. 

After the wedding breakfast, the couple departed Buckingham Palace in the 1902 State Landau for St Pancras Station. From St Pancras, they took the Silver Jubilee to Kettering for a honeymoon at nearby Boughton House, one of the bride's family homes.

References

Henry and Lady Alice Montagu Douglas Scott
Henry and Lady Alice Montagu Douglas Scott
Buckingham Palace
1935 in London